Vladivostok was the second Soviet Navy Project 1134 Admiral Zozulya-class Large Anti-submarine Ship (BPK) also known as a Kresta I guided missile cruiser. Launched on 1 August 1966, the ship was reclassified a Large Rocket Ship (RKR) on 3 August 1978 to reflect the wide-ranging capability of the vessel. Serving primarily in the Pacific Fleet during the Cold War, Vladivostok took part in exercises and tours that demonstrated Soviet naval power in the Indian and Pacific Oceans. The ship played a part at a number of points of potential escalation in the Cold War, including the Indo-Pakistani War of December 1971 and the collision between the aircraft carrier  and the submarine  in March 1984. Vladivostok was taken out of service to be modernised and updated on 28 September 1988 but there were insufficient funds to complete the work. Instead the ship was decommissioned on 19 April 1990 and, the following January, sold to an Australian company to be broken up.

Design and development

Design

Vladivostok was the second Project 1134 Berkut-class vessel launched. The class were envisioned as a more balanced follow-on to the specialist Project 58 and Project 61 classes, combining the attributes of both in a single hull. The vessels were approved by Nikita Khrushchev as part of Sergey Gorshkov's buildup of the Soviet Navy. Termed Kresta I cruisers by NATO, and also named the Admiral Zozulya class after the lead ship, the class were initially called Large Anti-submarine Ships ( or BPK) but this was changed to Large Rocket Ship (RKR) on 3 August 1978 to reflect their wider role.

Vladivostok displaced  standard and  full load, stretching  in length. The hull was made of steel upon which was mounted a large aluminium-magnesium alloy superstructure dominated by a radar complex including MR-500, MR-310 Angara-A, MRP-11-12, MRP-13-14 Uspekh-U and MRP-15-16 Zaliv search radars and a Volga navigation radar.

Power was provided by two TV-12 steam turbines, fuelled by four KVN-98/64 boilers and driving two fixed pitch screws that provided . Electricity was provided by a TD-760 driven off steam drawn from the main boilers which powered a 380 V AC circuit at a frequency of 50 Hz. Complement was 30 officers and 282 ratings.

Armament
Vladivostok was originally intended to mount the P-500 Bazalt (NATO reporting name SS-N-12 'Sandbox') but protracted development meant that instead the same 4K44 missiles (SS-N-3 'Shaddock') as the Project 58 warships mounted were retained. However, they were launched from two specially designed twin KT-35-1134 P-35 launchers mounted midships. An aft landing pad and hangar was fitted for a ranging Kamov Ka-25 helicopter to enable mid-course guidance.

Similarly, anti-aircraft defence was to be based around the new M-11 Shtorm (SA-N-3 'Goblet') system but this did not become operational until 1969. Instead, protection was enhanced by mounting two twin ZIF-102 M-1 Volna-M launchers, one forward and the other aft, and up to 64 4K91 (SA-N-1 'Goa') missiles, which was supplemented by two twin  AK-725 guns mounted on the aft superstructure. Fire control was directed by two 4R90 Yatagan units along with Binom-1134, MR-103 Bars, Grozna-1134 and Burya-1134 fire control systems along with a ARP-50R radio direction finder. Two Gurzuf ESM radar systems were fitted along with a ZIF-121 launcher for PK-2 decoy rockets. Threat response was coordinated with a Planshet-1134 combat information control system.

Defence against submarines was provided by two quintuple  torpedo launchers, a pair of six-barrelled RBU-1000 Smerch-3 launchers for  anti-submarine rockets and a pair of twelve-barrelled RBU-6000 Smerch-2 launchers for  anti-submarine rockets. A vastly improved anti-submarine sensor suite was also fitted, with MG-312M Titan and GAS-311 Vychegda sonars, the MG-26 Khosta underwater communication system and both MI-110R and MI-110K anti-submarine search stations.

In the early 1970s, Vladivostok was upgraded with a MR-212 Vaygach navigation radar added and the missiles updated to 4M44.

Construction and career

Construction
Vladivostok was laid down on 26 July 1964 at A.A. Zhdanov in Leningrad with yard number 792, and launched on 17 October 1965. The total cost of construction was 32 million rubles.

Career
The ship was then attached to the 175th Missile Ship Brigade of the Pacific Fleet, and visited by delegations from Bulgaria on 26 May 1970 and Poland five days later. During October, joining Project 58 , Vladivostok undertook test firing of the main missiles. More tests were undertaken with the Project 675 submarine "K-23" during August the following year.

The exercise was followed by an investigation of the testing areas used by the United States Navy in the Pacific Ocean until 3 October. The opportunity to test the United States defences was also taken.

On 3 December, the Bangladesh Liberation War was followed by an outbreak of war between India, supported by the Soviet Union and Pakistan, supported by the United States. The conflict quickly involved naval vessels, with the Indian Navy sinking the destroyer , minesweeper  and MV Venus Challenger on 4 December in Operation Trident using Soviet-built P-15 Termit anti-ship missiles.  Shortly afterwards on 9 December, the US-built submarine  of the Pakistan Navy sank the Indian frigate , the submarine then disappearing in mysterious circumstances. The threat of further escalation and the intervention of the United States Navy led to the Soviet Union dispatching a substantial fleet to the Indian Ocean. Vladivostok joined "Varyag", "Strogiy" and other vessels under the command of  dispatched on 13 December and remained on station until 6 March the following year. Following the success of the operation, the ship returned to Vladivostok. The ship was made open to the public during April 1972 and On 30 June, sailed on a tour with Minister of Defence Andrei Grechko, Admiral of the Fleet Sergey Gorshkov and other officials.

The next two decades were taken up with tests and exercises. While returning from one of these on 14 June 1973, submarine K-56 (Echo II class) collided with the science research vessel "Akademik Berg" and  sank, killing 27 of the crew. "Vladivostok" took part in the rescue effort. The ship closed the 1970s with a tour of the Indian Ocean, visiting allies in Port Louis, Mauritius, Victoria, Seychelles, Maputo, Mozambique, Cam Ranh Bay, Vietnam, the Dahlak Archipelago, which was at that time part of Ethiopia, and Aden, finishing in August 1978.Further tours took place in 1980. Port Louis was visited again on 15 August, Beira, Mozambique until 25 August and Kochi from 17 to 21 October.  the submarine  which then, while tailing the American vessel, collided with the larger ship in an incident that risked escalation into war.

On 28 September 1988, the ship was taken out of service to be repaired upgraded at Vladivostok. Lack of funding meant that work was only 90% complete when, instead, Vladivostok was decommissioned on 19 April 1990. The ship was sold to be broken up by an Australian company during January 1991.

Pennant numbers

Notes

References

Citations

Bibliography

1966 ships
Kresta I-class cruisers
Ships built at Severnaya Verf
Cold War cruisers of the Soviet Union